Aiona is a surname. Notable people with the surname include:

Ippy Aiona, American chef
Duke Aiona (born 1955), American politician and jurist